Matrix is a historical novel by Lauren Groff, published by Riverhead Books on September 7, 2021.

Premise
Groff's fourth novel, Matrix is about a "seventeen-year-old Marie de France... sent to England to be the new prioress of an impoverished abbey, its nuns on the brink of starvation and beset by disease." The Observer described it as "a strange and poetic piece of historical fiction set in a dreamlike abbey, the fictional biography of a 12th-century mystic." Within the novel, Marie, whom Groff writes as a lesbian, turns around the abbey's fortunes and treats it as a quasi-mystical female separatist "utopia".

Reception 
Matrix received very favorable reviews, with a cumulative "Rave" rating at the review aggregator website Book Marks, based on 31 book reviews from mainstream literary critics. The novel debuted at number eleven on The New York Times fiction best-seller list for the week ending September 11, 2021. Publishers Weekly, in its starred review, praised Groff's "boldly original narrative" and her "transcendent prose and vividly described settings" for bringing to life "historic events, from the Crusades to the papal interdict of 1208." Publishers Weekly concluded, "Groff has outdone herself with an accomplishment as radiant as Marie's visions." In its starred review, Kirkus Reviews wrote, "Groff's trademarkworthy sentences bring vivid buoyancy to a magisterial story."

However, historians of medieval women were more critical of the novel, with a review in Nursing Clio critiquing the book's "clichés [which] make the medieval world of the novel feel both more artificial and more distant from the present than it might" and its "bleak and stagnant medievalisms."

Matrix was shortlisted for the 2021 National Book Award for Fiction and the 2022 Andrew Carnegie Medal for Excellence in Fiction. It was selected for The Washington Posts "10 Best Books of 2021" list. Former United States President Barack Obama named Matrix one of his favorite books of 2021.

See also 
Agatha of Little Neon, a nun-focused novel published around the same time as Matrix

References 

2021 American novels
American historical novels
Novels by Lauren Groff
Novels set in England
Novels set in the 12th century
Nuns in fiction
Riverhead Books books
Novels with lesbian themes